Arechia is an extinct genus of stingaree from the Eocene epoch. It is the oldest known stingaree genus, though molecular data suggests they diverged from Butterfly rays about 75 million years ago or from Deepwater stingrays around the time of the K-Pg transition. The type species, A. arambourgi, is known from isolated teeth found in the Ypresian deposits of Ouled Abdoun, Morocco. It is named for Camille Arambourg, who originally ascribed these teeth to Raja praealba in 1952. Henri Cappetta revised the species in 1983, erecting this genus for those Arambourg called males in this genus and placed the ones he called females in Merabatis. The second species, A. crassicaudata is from the Ypresian-age Bolca Lagerstätte of Italy and is known from several articulated individuals. This species was described in 1818 and was placed in various genera until finally being attributed to this one in 2020. The inferred environment of the Monte Postale site where this species is found matches with the typical warm, shallow environment of extant representatives of this family.

References

Urolophidae
Prehistoric cartilaginous fish genera